Get Behind Me Satan is the fifth studio album by the American rock duo the White Stripes, released on June 7, 2005, on V2 Records. Though still basic in production style, the album marked a distinct change from its guitar-heavy 2003 predecessor, Elephant. With its reliance on piano-driven melodies and experimentation with marimba on "The Nurse" and "Forever For Her (Is Over For Me)", Get Behind Me Satan plays down the punk, garage rock and blues influences that dominated earlier White Stripes albums. Frontman Jack White plays with different technique than in the past, replacing electric guitar with piano, mandolin, and acoustic guitar on all but a handful of tracks, as his usual riff-conscious lead guitar style is overtaken by a predominantly rhythmic approach. 

Get Behind Me Satan was positively received by critics. Rolling Stone ranked it the third best album of the year and it received the Grammy for Best Alternative Music Album in 2006. As of February 2007, Get Behind Me Satan had sold 850,000 units in the United States.

Background and production
In the King James Version, the quotation is slightly different: "Get thee behind me, Satan".

Jack White stated in an interview on the radio show Fresh Air that "truth is the number one theme throughout the album Get Behind Me Satan."  Relating that point to the album's multiple reference to movie actress Rita Hayworth, White said she became an "all-encompassing metaphor" for the album since she changed her last name from something that revealed her Latina heritage, and the way celebrity was cast upon her. White told Rolling Stone, "Rita Hayworth became an all-encompassing metaphor for everything I was thinking about while making the album. There was an autograph of hers—she had kissed a piece of paper, left a lip print on it, and underneath it said, 'My heart is in my mouth.' I loved that statement and wondered why she wrote that. There was also the fact that she was Latino and had changed her name. She had become something different, morphed herself and was trying to put something behind her. And there was the shallowness of celebrity when it's thrown upon you. All of that was going around in these songs; what had been thrown on me, things I'd never asked for. Every song on that album is about truth."

Get Behind Me Satan was, for ten years, the only album by The White Stripes to not be commercially released in a vinyl format. The White Stripes had intended to re-record Get Behind Me Satan entirely live in a New Zealand studio and wanted that to be the official vinyl version, but the studio that they were planning to record it in no longer had the recording equipment to make it possible, so there was no commercially released vinyl version of the album. However, copies of the album on vinyl LP were made to be given exclusively to music journalists for review. They were released by both XL Recordings and V2 Records and each label issued only 300, making the total 600. These albums have become rare and coveted collector's items. For Record Store Day 2015, Jack White's Third Man Records finally released a limited vinyl edition with a lenticular gatefold sleeve, pressed on red and white vinyl; a commercially released version with standard artwork pressed on standard black vinyl was released later that year.

Cover art homages
The album cover was used in the Gilmore Girls episode "I Get a Sidekick Out of You", with Lane and Zach in Meg and Jack's positions, respectively. It was also used for the 2008 Ozy and Millie calendar as both the front cover and for the month of January with the characters Ozy and Mille replacing Jack and Meg.

Reception

Get Behind Me Satan entered the U.S. and UK charts at No. 3, ranking higher in the U.S. charts than their previous records, but lower in the UK charts than Elephant. "Blue Orchid", the first single, became a radio hit in the United States and the band's second UK Top 10 hit. "My Doorbell" was the second single from the album, followed by "The Denial Twist". Both also reached the Top 10 in the UK and charted on the Modern Rock Charts as well.

In 2006, the album was included in 1001 Albums You Must Hear Before You Die, edited by Robert Dimery, but was removed in the 2007 edition. "Instinct Blues" was featured in Michel Gondry's 2006 film The Science of Sleep. It was voted the sixth best album of the year in the 2006 Village Voice Pazz and Jop critic poll, with the song "My Doorbell" being voted as the year's ninth best single.

Track listing

Get Behind Me Satan features alternate track sequencing on its vinyl release.

CD track listing

Vinyl track listing

Personnel
Sourced from AllMusic's credits.

The White Stripes
Jack White – lead vocals, guitar, piano, bass, mandolin, marimba, tambourine, songwriting, production, mixing
Meg White – drums, percussion, bells, triangle, backing vocals, lead vocals on "Passive Manipulation"

Additional personnel
Howie Weinberg – mastering
John Hampton – mixing

Charts

Weekly charts

Year-end charts

Certifications and sales

References

External links

The White Stripes albums
2005 albums
Concept albums
V2 Records albums
XL Recordings albums
Grammy Award for Best Alternative Music Album
Albums produced by Jack White